Rudy Croes (5 September 1946 – 20 November 2021) was an Aruban politician. A member of the People's Electoral Movement, he briefly served as President of the Parliament of Aruba in 2005 after having been a member of the Parliament of Aruba from 1989 to 1993 and 1994 to 2001. He was also Minister of Justice from 1993 to 1994 and 2001 to 2009.

References

1946 births
2021 deaths
Aruban politicians
Government ministers of Aruba
Presidents of the Estates of Aruba
Members of the Estates of Aruba
People's Electoral Movement (Aruba) politicians